Tilahun Alemayehu (born 10 July 1962) is an Ethiopian former cyclist. He competed in the team time trial event at the 1980 Summer Olympics.

References

External links
 

1962 births
Living people
Ethiopian male cyclists
Olympic cyclists of Ethiopia
Cyclists at the 1980 Summer Olympics
Sportspeople from Addis Ababa